Henglin railway station is a reserved railway station of Shanghai-Nanjing Intercity Railway located in Jiangsu, People's Republic of China.

It was a station of Beijing-Shanghai railway that was opened in 1906, and closed in 2009.

Railway stations in Jiangsu
Stations on the Shanghai–Nanjing Intercity Railway